Willie's Blues is Willie Dixon's debut album, released in 1959. Given almost equal credit on the album was his piano accompanist, Memphis Slim, who played on all of the tracks, and wrote the two numbers that were not penned by Dixon.

The album was issued on the Prestige Bluesville record label in the vinyl format. According to the original liner notes, the album was recorded during a two-hour recording span, in between flights.  It was recorded at Rudy Van Gelder's studio in Englewood Cliffs, New Jersey.

The album was re-issued on CD in June 1992 on Charly - catalog reference CDCHD 349.

Critical reception
The Rolling Stone Album Guide wrote: "Imbued with a dark, after-hours ambience, the album is Dixon's strongest solo recording."

Track listing
All songs written by Willie Dixon, except where indicated.
"Nervous" 3:15
"Good Understanding" 2:15 
"That's My Baby" 3:22 
"Slim's Thing"  (Memphis Slim) 3:24 
"That's All I Want Baby" 2:15 
"Don't You Tell Nobody" 2:09 
"Youth to You" 3:24 
"Sittin' and Cryin' the Blues"  3:23 
"Built for Comfort" 2:32 
"I Got a Razor" 4:14 
"Go Easy" (Memphis Slim)  5:52 
"Move Me" 3:20

Personnel
Willie Dixon - double bass, vocals   
Memphis Slim - piano  
Gus Johnson - drums 
Wally Richardson - guitar
Al Ashby - tenor saxophone
Harold Ashby - tenor saxophone
Technical
Esmond Edwards - supervisor  
Dale Wright - liner notes

References

1959 debut albums
Bluesville Records albums
Willie Dixon albums
Albums produced by Esmond Edwards
Albums recorded at Van Gelder Studio